Pirogov, or Pirogova (feminine; Пирогова) is a Russian surname, derived from the word "пирог" (pie or cake). Notable people with the surname include:
Alexander Pirogov (1899–1964), Russian Soviet opera singer
Grigory Pirogov (1885–1931), Russian Soviet opera singer
Kirill Pirogov (born 1973), Russian actor
Nikolay Ivanovich Pirogov (1810–1881), prominent Russian scientist
Pirogov (film), 1947 Soviet film, notable for the musical score composed by Dmitri Shostakovich
Pirogov Hospital, a hospital in Sofia, Bulgaria named after him
2506 Pirogov, an asteroid named after him
Pirogov Park, a park in Tartu, Estonia, named after him
Pirogov, Leonid Gregor (1910-1968), A Soviet Actor.
Nikolay Nikolayevich Pirogov (1843–1891), Russian physicist and son of Nikolay Ivanovich Pirogov
Vladimir Pirogov (1918–2001), Soviet aircraft pilot and Hero of the Soviet Union

See also
Pyrohiv, or "Pirogovo", a historic location in the outskirts of Kiev, Ukraine, that houses an open-air museum
Pirogovo

Russian-language surnames